Justin McInerney (born 18 August 2000) is a professional Australian rules footballer who plays for the Sydney Swans in the Australian Football League (AFL).

Early life
McInerney was raised in the northern suburbs of Melbourne and participated in the Auskick program at Macleod, Victoria. 

He was educated at Marcellin College and played junior football with the Northern Knights in the TAC Cup.

McInerney was recruited by the Sydney Swans with the 44th draft pick in the 2018 AFL Draft.

AFL career
He made his debut against  in round 4 of the 2019 AFL season. McInerney received a Rising Star nomination for his performance against the Melbourne Football Club in Round 15 of the 2020 AFL season. In that game McInerney kicked 2 goals, collected 14 disposals and took 5 marks.

Statistics
Updated to the end of the 2022 season.

|-
| 2019 ||  || 27
| 1 || 0 || 0 || 1 || 0 || 1 || 0 || 2 || 0.0 || 0.0 || 1.0 || 0.0 || 1.0 || 0.0 || 2.0 || 0
|-
| 2020 ||  || 27
| 9 || 5 || 0 || 60 || 65 || 125 || 26 || 13 || 0.6 || 0.0 || 6.7 || 7.2 || 13.9 || 2.9 || 1.4 || 0
|-
| 2021 ||  || 27
| 21 || 7 || 2 || 229 || 150 || 379 || 113 || 23 || 0.3 || 0.1 || 10.9 || 7.1 || 18.0 || 5.4 || 1.1 || 0
|-
| 2022 ||  || 27
| 25 || 6 || 4 || 247 || 138 || 385 || 104 || 23 || 0.3 || 0.2 || 11.2 || 6.3 || 17.5 || 4.7 || 1.0 || 2
|- class=sortbottom
! colspan=3 | Career
! 53 !! 18 !! 6 !! 537 !! 353 !! 890 !! 243 !! 61 !! 0.3 !! 0.1 !! 10.1 !! 6.7 !! 16.8 !! 4.6 !! 1.2 !! 2
|}

Notes

Honours and achievements
Individual
 2× AFL Rising Star nominee: 2020 (round 15), 2021 (round 16)

References

External links

2000 births
Living people
Sydney Swans players
Northern Knights players
Australian rules footballers from Victoria (Australia)
People educated at Marcellin College, Bulleen